The Voice of Holland (season 3) was the third season of the Dutch reality singing competition, created by media tycoon John de Mol and the first sophomore season ever of the show's format. It was aired from August to December 2012 on RTL4.

One of the important premises of the show is the quality of the singing talent. Four coaches, themselves popular performing artists, train the talents in their group and occasionally perform with them. Talents are selected in blind auditions, where the coaches cannot see, but only hear the auditioner.

Martijn Krabbé and Wendy van Dijk, who was co-hosting season two, remained as co-hosts. Winston Gerschtanowitz was interviewing the contestants and their inmates backstage.

Nick & Simon and Roel van Velzen returned for their third and final season as coaches, while Marco Borsato returned for his second season. Angela Groothuizen was replaced by singer Trijntje Oosterhuis. She won in her first season through her team contestant Leona Philippo in the final held on 14 December 2012 against over Johannes Rypma for Team Nick & Simon who came runner-up. Leona Philippo's win came with 56% of the votes in her favor. The ratings for the last show where the highest ratings The Voice of Holland ever had. 4.6 million people watched the show.

Summary of competitors
Competitors' table
 – Winner
 – Runner-up
 – Third
 – Fourth
 – Eliminated after semi-finals
 – Eliminated after quarter finals
 – Eliminated during first or second live round
 – Eliminated during the Battle rounds

External links
 The Voice of Holland Official website

Season 03
2012 Dutch television seasons